Draco lineatus, the lined flying dragon, is a species of agamid lizard. It is found in Indonesia, the Philippines, and Malaysia.

References

Draco (genus)
Reptiles of Indonesia
Reptiles of the Philippines
Reptiles of Malaysia
Reptiles described in 1802
Taxa named by John Edward Gray